Antonio María Romeu Marrero (11 September 1876 – 18 January 1955) was a Cuban pianist, composer and bandleader. His orchestra was Cuba's leading charanga for over thirty years, specializing in the danzón. Throughout his career he was popularly known as El Mago de las Teclas (The Keyboard Magician).

Life and career 
Romeu studied music in 1884 with Joaquín Mariano Martínez, and practiced the piano at a local church by the beach in Jibacoa. At twelve he played at his first dance, and composed his first work. In 1899 he moved to Havana and played in cafés. He was invited to play in the Orquesta Cervantes, one of several charangas founded at the beginning of the 1900s. Charangas supplanted the típicas as the standard instrumental line-up for the danzón. Initially called charangas francesas (though they have nothing to do with France), they were 'invented' at the start of the 20th century. The basic idea was to pitch the tone of the orchestra higher and brighter than the típica, by removing the brass, replacing the clarinet with a flute and replacing the kettle drums with a new invention, the pailas criollas, now called timbales. Orquesta Cervantes is the earliest known charanga to have included a piano.

Romeu founded his own orchestra in 1910. The initial line-up for Orquesta Romeu featured Romeu on piano, Feliciano Facenda on violin, Alfredo Valdés on flute, Rafael Calazán on double bass, Remigio Valdés on timbales, and Juan de la Merced on güiro. By the 1920s the charanga had expanded considerably, featuring Francisco Delabart on flute, Augusto Valdés on clarinet, Juan Quevedo on violin, Aurelio Valdés and Félix Vásquez on güiro, Antonio María Romeu Jr. on violin, Pedro Hernández on violin, Dihigo on trumpet, Regueira on trombone, and José Antonio Díaz on flute. In the 1930s the orchestra added even more musicians, and became for a while a big band (known in Cuba as jazzband). During the Second World War, with a diminution of tourism, the band reduced its size.

The danzón had been, since its beginning in the 1870s, an instrumental genre, but by 1927 bands began to include a singer. The Romeu orchestra had initially Fernando Collazo in the role, who was replaced by Barbarito Díez in 1935. From the beginning, and throughout his career, Romeu employed musicians of all racial types, as Cuban bands had done since at least 1800.

After Romeu's death in January 1955, the orchestra was led for a while by his son, Antonio María Romeu Jr., then by Barbarito Díez. It still played the traditional danzón, but now was known as Orquesta de Barbarito Díez.

Compositions 
Romeu wrote and arranged over 500 danzones, many of which have been adapted for other Cuban rhythms; some were completely original, others were adaptations of existing works. His most famous work was "Tres lindas cubanas", which was an arrangement of the son of the same name, written by guitarist Guillermo Castillo and made famous by the Sexteto Habanero. Other famous danzones were "Siglo XX", "La danza do los milliones", "El servicio obligartorio", "Cinta azul", "El mago de las teclas", and "Jibacoa". He arranged many famous works of the trova, Cuba's singer/songwriter tradition, such as "Guarina" and "Perla marina" (Sindo Garay), "Mares y arenas" (Rosendo Ruiz), "Mercedes" (Manuel Corona), "Aquella boca" (Eusebio Delfín) and "La cleptomanía" (Manuel Luna). In addition, he adapted classical works such as "La flauta mágica" (from Mozart's The Magic Flute) and "El barbero de Sevilla" (from Rossini's ''The Barber of Seville).

References

External links
 Antonio María Romeu recordings at the Discography of American Historical Recordings.

1876 births
1955 deaths
Cuban pianists
Cuban composers
Male composers
Cuban bandleaders
Cuban charanga musicians
Danzón musicians
Danzón composers
People from Havana
Cuban male musicians